Socialist Single Front (Spanish: Frente Único Socialista, FUS) was a Bolivian electoral political alliance of left-wing and socialist political parties and organizations.

The Socialist Single Front was established on 18 February 1938, for the 1938 congressional elections, by these parties:

Legion of Veterans
Confederation of Bolivian Workers
Workers' Party
Popular Front of Potosi
United Socialist Party
Republican Socialist Party
Independent Socialist Party.

The Socialist Single Front was associated with the revolutionary government of Colonel Germán Busch Becerra and elected majority deputies of the new Constituent Assembly.

Notes

1938 establishments in Bolivia
Defunct left-wing political party alliances
Defunct political party alliances in Bolivia
Political parties established in 1938
Socialist parties in Bolivia
Political parties with year of disestablishment missing
Bolivia